WRUA (channel 8), branded on-air as Tiva TV, is a Spanish-language independent television station serving northeastern Puerto Rico that is licensed to Fajardo. The station is owned by Eastern Television Corporation and operated by Grupo TIVA, a joint venture between Dr. Norman Gonzalez Chacon, under Dr. Norman's Broadcasting (stockholder), Iglesia Cristiana El Caballero de la Cruz (station licensee) & Alejandro Luciano (shareholder, owner of translator stations). The station is showing lifestyle and health programs. WRUA maintains its studios located at Julio Andino Street, at the corner of Simon Madera Avenue in Rio Piedras and its transmitter is located in the El Yunque National Forest.

W08EI-D (virtual and digital channel 8) in Guaynabo operates as a full-time translator of WRUA, serving San Juan and eastern Puerto Rico. The station is owned by Alejandro Luciano. The transmitter is located at Cerro La Marquesa in Aguas Buenas.

History
On March 7, 1997, WRUA channel 34 started broadcasting religious programming. WRUA was owned by Damarys de Jesus, who serves as a general manager. In 2000, WRUA is sold to Eastern Television Corporation for $40,000, and joining the Telecadena ECN religious network, as satellite of WECN.

From 2006 to 2007, WRUA operated as a standard independent station, using the Citytv branding, under license from CHUM Limited – it was the first Citytv franchise on American soil. Rogers Media discontinued the licensing for WRUA, after its acquisition of Citytv, and the station formerly serves as a translator for WECN.

Both prior to its time as Citytv and after, WRUA was and still is a religious station.

WECN & WRUA forces to shut down on October 22, 2014, due to financial reasons. as of 2015, WECN is Silent, and its sale is pending to the new officers & directors, under Único TV Media for $1.9 million. On March 1, 2015; WRUA returns to the air, and will become a Satellite of WVQS-LD, repeating Telemicro Internacional on Channel 33.1 & The Retro Channel on 33.2. On April 17, WRUA will become a full-time Locally owned Independent station, broadcasting Retro Music Videos on channel 33.1, just before WVQS-LD moves CTNi to 50.1 & Telemicro Internacional to WSJU-TV channel 31.1.

On August 10, 2015, WRUA moves its frequency from 33.1 to channel 8.1, becoming a satellite of WWXY-LD, as part of the Tiva TV Network.

On October 27, 2015, WRUA will sell $1,000,000 to Grupo TIVA (Dr. Norman Gonzalez, president, Edwin Gonzalez, general manager), the owners of WWXY-LD, marking its move to low-power channel 38, and will become the first full-power VHF O&O television station to be owned by TIVA. The sale was completed on December 7, 2015.

Digital television
The stations' digital signals are multiplexed:

Analog-to-digital conversion

On February 17, 2009, WECN and WRUA signed off their analog signals.

Translator stations
WRUA can be seen across Puerto Rico on the following stations:

References

External links

RUA
Television channels and stations established in 1997
Fajardo, Puerto Rico
1997 establishments in Puerto Rico
Independent television stations